Spider-Man and the X-Men is a six-issue superhero limited series written by Elliott Kalan, drawn by Marco Failla, and published by Marvel Comics between December 2014 and April 2015.

Publication history
Marvel began publishing a comic series titled Wolverine and the X-Men in 2011, but the series ended when the lead character died in 2014. Writer Elliott Kalan and artist Marco Failla continued the storyline, replacing Wolverine with Spider-Man. This volume lasted six issues from December 2014 to April 2015.

A trade paperback collecting all six issues was released August 4, 2015.

Synopsis
Following the death of Wolverine, Spider-Man honors a request in his will to become a faculty member at the Jean Grey School for Higher Learning and tries to teach ethics to troubled students. At the same time, he secretly investigates the students because Wolverine asked him to locate a traitor. After a number of unrelated fights and adventures, one of his students, Ernst, reveals that she made a deal with the evil Mister Sinister in an effort to help No-Girl. Sinister betrays Ernst, who then works with her classmates and Spider-Man to defeat Sinister and save nearby civilians. Because of their teamwork, no one is expelled from the school and the students are allowed to go on weekly patrols with Spider-Man.

Critical reception
Spider-Man and the X-Men #1 sold 61,952 copies the month of release, making it the 14th best selling issue in December 2014. It received an average score of 6.9/10 based on 20 reviews according to review aggregator Comic Book Roundup. Newsarama.com writer Pierce Lydon said, "Daily Show head writer Elliott Kalan is at the helm, but a throwaway cast and a concept borrowed in part from the last few years of Young Avengers titles doesn't help this one."

Animated Series
There was no actual animated series of Spider-Man and the X-Men. Although there were two episodes of "Spider-Man and His Amazing Friends that were "A Fire-Star Is Born" in the Second season and "The X-Men Adventure" in the third and last season that starred X-Men characters. Also there was a two part story built with episodes "The Mutant Agenda" and "Mutants' Revenge" that was a part of the "Spider-Man (1994 TV series)

Video Games 
There were two games that starred Spider-Man and the X-Men. In the 1990s, there was a game for "Sega Genesis, "Game Gear, "Game Boy, and "Super NES called "Spider-Man and the X-Men in Arcade's Revenge. In 2001, Spider-Man joined the list of X-Men characters in "X-Men: Mutant Academy 2 .

References

External links
 
 

Spider-Man titles
Superhero comics
X-Men titles
2014 comics debuts